The Men's 4 × 10 kilometre relay competition at the FIS Nordic World Ski Championships 2021 was held on 5 March 2021.

Results
The race was started at 13:15.

References

Men's 4 x 10 kilometre relay